"Keep the Customer Satisfied" is a song by American music duo Simon & Garfunkel  from the group's fifth studio album, Bridge over Troubled Water (1970). It was included as the B side of their signature hit, "Bridge Over Troubled Water". "Keep the Customer Satisfied" recounts the exhausting tours that Simon grew tired of, a similar theme to that of their earlier song, "Homeward Bound".

The label also promoted the song as an A side on a special promo-only single with the album version of "America" as the B side.

Gary Puckett & The Union Gap cover

"Keep the Customer Satisfied" was recorded by Gary Puckett for his solo LP, The Gary Puckett Album (1971), produced by Richard Perry.  "Keep the Customer Satisfied" reached No. 71 on Billboard in the winter of 1971. It reached No. 50 on the Cash Box chart, and No. 38 in Canada.

Chart performance

Puckett cover

Hunt cover

Notable cover versions
In the United Kingdom, the song charted at number 41 in February, 1970 as performed by Marsha Hunt.
The Jamaican vocal duo Bob and Marcia performed the song on their 1970 album Young, Gifted and Black.

References

External links
  (Simon & Garfunkel)
  (Gary Puckett)

Simon & Garfunkel songs
1970 singles
Songs written by Paul Simon
Song recordings produced by Roy Halee
Song recordings produced by Paul Simon
Song recordings produced by Art Garfunkel
Columbia Records singles
1970 songs
1971 singles
Gary Puckett & The Union Gap songs
Song recordings produced by Richard Perry